Oscar Randal "Randy" Clay (May 30, 1928 – July 19, 2006) was an American football halfback and defensive back. He played for the New York Giants in 1950 and 1953.

References

1928 births
2006 deaths
American football halfbacks
American football defensive backs
Texas Longhorns football players
New York Giants players